Bernard Debré (30 September 194413 September 2020) was a French urologist at Hôpital Cochin and a member (deputy) of the National Assembly of France. He was one of the representatives of the city of Paris, and was a member of the Union for a Popular Movement. He is a son of Anne-Marie Lemaresquier and politician Michel Debré, who was Prime Minister of France, and twin-brother of Jean-Louis Debré.

Biography 

Bernard Debré attended the Cours Hattemer, a private school. He died from cancer on 13 September 2020, at the age of 75.

References

1944 births
2020 deaths
Chevaliers of the Légion d'honneur
Councillors of Paris
Deaths from cancer in France
Deputies of the 13th National Assembly of the French Fifth Republic
Deputies of the 14th National Assembly of the French Fifth Republic
French people of Jewish descent
French urologists
Mayors of places in Centre-Val de Loire
Physicians from Toulouse
Pierre and Marie Curie University alumni
The Popular Right
The Republicans (France) politicians
French twins